Brett Charles Young (born March 23, 1981) is an American country pop singer, songwriter and guitarist from Orange County, California. He was a college baseball pitcher but took up songwriting after an elbow injury. His self-titled debut EP, produced by Dann Huff, was released by Republic Nashville on February 12, 2016. The lead single, "Sleep Without You", was released on April 11, and he had a major success with his following single, "In Case You Didn't Know".  He released his second major label album  Ticket to L.A. in 2018, and the third, Weekends Look a Little Different These Days, in 2021.

Early life
Young was born in Anaheim, Orange County. He attended Calvary Chapel High School in Costa Mesa, California, and then Ole Miss, Irvine Valley College, and Fresno State. He started singing in the late 1990s when he stepped in to replace an absent leader of the band during a Christian worship meeting at high school.

Young was a pitcher on his high school baseball team and led the squad to a CIF championship. He went to Ole Miss on a baseball scholarship in 1999 after turning down pre-draft selection by both Tampa Bay Devil Rays and Minnesota Twins. In his one-season on the Rebel baseball team in 2000, he earned a varsity letter and posted two wins and two saves. He then lettered for one season at Irvine Valley before moving to Fresno. However, his pursuit of a professional baseball career was cut short by an elbow injury while at Fresno in 2003.

Music career
According to Young, he was inspired by Gavin DeGraw after he heard his album Chariot as well as singer-songwriter Jeremy Steele and decided to return to music. Young independently released a self-titled four-song EP in 2007, then Make Believe in 2011, followed by the albums Brett Young, On Fire, and Broken Down in 2012–13.

After eight years based in Los Angeles, Young moved to Nashville. He was soon signed by the Big Machine Label Group in August 2015.

2016–present: Brett Young EP and album

In February 2016, Young released a six-song self-titled EP. "Sleep Without You" was released as the first single from the EP in April 2016. Young wrote the song with Justin Ebach and Kelly Archer. The second single to be released from the album "In Case You Didn't Know", was released January 9, 2017.  The song was Young's first to reach number one on the Country Airplay chart, and it has been certified 5× Platinum by RIAA. The album's third single, "Like I Loved You" released to country radio on July 17, 2017.

On February 10, 2017, Young released his self-titled debut studio album Brett Young. The album was produced by Dann Huff, and released through Big Machine Label Group. It debuted at number two on the Top Country Albums chart.  Brett is currently touring with his band which includes lead guitarist Keaton Simons, drummer Billy Hawn, Keys/guitarist Matt Ferranti, and bass guitarist Noah Needleman.

2018–2020: Ticket to L.A.
In December 2018, Young released his sophomore album Ticket to L.A.. The lead single for the album, "Here Tonight", which he co-wrote with Ben Caver, Justin Ebach and Charles Kelley, was released in September 2018. It reached at number one on the Country Airplay in April 2019. The album's second single, "Catch" released to country radio on June 3, 2019.

2020–present: Weekends Look a Little Different These Days
In April 2020, Young released the single "Lady", which he wrote about his wife and daughter. It serves as the lead-off single to his third studio album Weekends Look a Little Different These Days, which was released on June 4, 2021. "Lady" reached number one on the Country Airplay chart in April 2021. The album's second single "Not Yet" was released the same month. However, it was less successful, only peaking at number 37 on the Country Airplay chart, becoming Young's first single to miss the Top 10, as well as his lowest-charting single to date. A third single "You Didn't" was released in November 2021.

In October 2021, Young released a Christmas album Brett Young & Friends Sing the Christmas Classics.

Personal life
In February 2018, Young got engaged to his girlfriend Taylor Mills. The couple wed in Palm Desert, California on November 3, 2018. On April 6, 2019, they announced they are expecting their first child in the fall 2019. Their daughter Presley was born on October 21, 2019. On January 27, 2021, they announced they were expecting their second child in summer 2021. Their second daughter Rowan was born on July 21, 2021.

Discography

Brett Young (2012)
 On Fire (2013)
Broken Down (2013)
 Brett Young (2017)
Ticket to L.A. (2018)
 Weekends Look a Little Different These Days (2021)

Awards and nominations

Television appearances

Notes

References

External links

American country singer-songwriters
American male singer-songwriters
Country musicians from California
Living people
Musicians from Orange County, California
Republic Records artists
Singer-songwriters from California
1981 births
21st-century American singers
21st-century American male singers